James Everette Crowell (born May 14, 1974) is an American former professional baseball pitcher, who has played in Major League Baseball (MLB) for the Cincinnati Reds, Philadelphia Phillies, and Florida Marlins.

Crowell attended Valparaiso High School and the University of Indianapolis.

References

External links

Jim Crowell at Pura Pelota (Venezuelan Professional Baseball League)

1974 births
Living people
Akron Aeros players
Albuquerque Isotopes players
American expatriate baseball players in Canada
Arkansas Travelers players
Atlantic City Surf players
Baseball players from Minneapolis
Charleston AlleyCats players
Chattanooga Lookouts players
Cincinnati Reds players
Columbus Red Stixx players
Florida Marlins players
Gary SouthShore RailCats players
Indianapolis Greyhounds baseball players
Indianapolis Indians players
Kinston Indians players
Major League Baseball pitchers
Mobile BayBears players
Navegantes del Magallanes players
American expatriate baseball players in Venezuela
Ottawa Lynx players
Philadelphia Phillies players
Portland Beavers players
Scranton/Wilkes-Barre Red Barons players
Syracuse Chiefs players
Venados de Mazatlán players
American expatriate baseball players in Mexico
Watertown Indians players